The 2006–07 CEV Champions League was the 48th edition of the highest level European volleyball club competition organised by the European Volleyball Confederation.

League round

Pool A

|}

Pool B

|}

Pool C

|}

Pool D

|}

Playoffs

Playoff 12

|}

First leg

|}

Second leg

|}

Playoff 6

|}

First leg

|}

Second leg

|}

Final Four
Organizer:  Dynamo Moscow
 Place: Moscow

Semifinals

|}

3rd place match

|}

Final

|}

Final standings

Awards

Most Valuable Player
  Jochen Schöps (VfB Friedrichshafen)
Best Scorer
  Hichem Guemmadi (Tours VB)
Best Spiker
  Alessandro Paparoni (Lube Banca Marche Macerata)
Best Server
  Matey Kaziyski (Dynamo Moscow)

Best Blocker
  Aleksandr Volkov (Dynamo Moscow)
Best Receiver
  Lukáš Diviš (VfB Friedrichshafen)
Best Libero
  Markus Steuerwald (VfB Friedrichshafen)
Best Setter
  Loïc De Kergret (Tours VB)

External links
 2006/07 European Champions League

CEV Champions League
2006 in volleyball
2007 in volleyball